Pedro Oscar Mayorga (1921 – 6 January 2014) was an Argentine equestrian who competed in the 1956 Summer Olympics in Stockholm, Sweden. In 1947, he met rider Elena Argañaraz on the circuit and they married eight months later. They competed at FEI events in Europe and America throughout the 1950s. They had five children, three of whom – Eduardo, Juan Francisco, and Pablo Mayorga – are involved in equestrian sport.

References

1921 births
2014 deaths
Sportspeople from Buenos Aires
Argentine male equestrians
Olympic equestrians of Argentina
Equestrians at the 1956 Summer Olympics
Pan American Games silver medalists for Argentina
Medalists at the 1955 Pan American Games
Pan American Games medalists in equestrian
Equestrians at the 1955 Pan American Games